O’Riordan is a surname of Irish origin.

Famous people with this surname include:
Aodhán Ó Ríordáin (born 1976), Irish politician
Brendan O'Riordan, Irish football player
Brian O'Riordan (born 1981), Irish rugby player
Cait O'Riordan (born 1965), British rock musician
Conal Holmes O'Connell O'Riordan (1874–1948), Irish dramatist and novelist
Dolores O'Riordan (1971–2018), Irish singer and songwriter
Don O'Riordan (born 1957), Irish football player and coach
Eugene O'Riordan, Irish author and professor of mathematics
Jerry O'Riordan (fl. mid-20th century), Irish hurler
Julius O'Riordan (born 1966), British DJ
Mark O'Riordan (born 1980), Irish hurler
Michael O'Riordan (1917–2006), Irish communist; founder of the Communist Party of Ireland
Mossy O'Riordan (fl. mid-20th century), Irish hurler
Rachel O'Riordan (born 1971/1972), Irish theatre director
Robert O'Riordan (born 1943), Canadian author
Seán Ó Ríordáin (1917–1977), Irish poet

See also
Riordan, a surname

Surnames
Anglicised Irish-language surnames
Surnames of Irish origin